The New Research Building (or NRB for short) is the largest building ever built by Harvard University, and was dedicated on September 24, 2003 by the then president of Harvard University, Lawrence H. Summers and the dean of the Harvard Medical School, Joseph Martin.

It is an integrated biomedical research facility, located at 77 Avenue Louis Pasteur, Boston, Massachusetts, at the Longwood Medical Area and has  of space. It cost $260 million to build, and houses more than 800 researchers, and many more graduate students, lab assistants, and staff workers. The building sits across the street from the Boston Latin School on the former site of Boston English High School.

It constitutes the largest expansion of Harvard Medical school witnessed in the last 100 years. It houses the Department of Genetics of the Harvard Medical School, among many other centers and institutes it houses. It is also home to many meetings, and has a 500-seat auditorium.

The architects were Architectural Resources Cambridge, Inc. (ARC) who are active in the Boston/Cambridge area and have built other educational and research facilities.

References

Biotechnology
Harvard Medical School
Harvard University buildings
Educational buildings in Boston